Troglav may refer to:
Troglav (mythology), deity in Slavic mythology whose three heads were believed to represent sky, earth and the underworld
 Troglav (Bosnia and Herzegovina), a mountain massif and peak in western Bosnia and Herzegovina on the border with Croatia
 NK Troglav Livno, a football club named after the aforementioned peak
 Troglav (Serbia), a mountain in central Serbia